Serena Williams was the defending champion, but lost in the second round to Sun Tiantian. Tiantian became the first ever player ranked outside the top 100 to defeat Williams in a main draw match.

Maria Kirilenko won the title by defeating Anna-Lena Grönefeld 6–3, 6–4 in the final.

Seeds
The top four seeds receive a bye into the second round.

Draw

Finals

Top half

Bottom half

References
 Main and Qualifying Draw (WTA)

2005 WTA Tour
2005 China Open (tennis)